Best Of Live (1996–2005) is a live album released by Serbian heavy metal band Kraljevski Apartman reconsisting of the band's finest works and presenting an aspect of the band's live appearance. The band members wanted to celebrate the first decade of the band's existence by recording a live performance and releasing it on CD and DVD formats. This resulted the release of this CD and DVD 10 godina sa vama - Live SKC.

Track listing 
All songs were written by Zoran Zdravković except where noted.

"Nikad se ne predajem" – 8:03
"Izaberi jedan put" – 3:46
"Rocker" – 3:37
"Za ljubav ne treba da moliš" – 6:02
"Sve su noći iste" – 3:40
"Dama iz K.A." – 3:51
"Sve u svoje vreme" – 4:04
"Jesen" – 6:13
"U lavirintu sedam greha" – 3:52
"Izgubljen u vremenu" – 4:28
"Dao sam sve od sebe" – 5:27
"Ruka pravde" – 6:46
"Misterija" – 5:02
"Ranjena zver" – 3:53
"Znam da život kratko traje" – 4:37

Personnel 
Zoran Lalović – vocals
Zoran Zdravković – guitar
Zoran Rončević – drums
Marko Nikolić – bass guitar
Dejan Đorđević – keyboards

Kraljevski Apartman albums
2005 live albums
PGP-RTS live albums